Tim O. Baylor (born May 23, 1954 in Washington, D.C.) is a former American football defensive back in the National Football League. He played college football at Morgan State University in Baltimore, Maryland, and was drafted by the Baltimore Colts in the tenth round of the 1976 NFL Draft. He played for the Colts for three seasons and the Minnesota Vikings for one season in 1979. Baylor was the tallest defensive back in history of the NFL at 6'6" 
He is a member of Iota Phi Theta fraternity.

Post football Career
Even since retiring from the NFL, Baylor has been very involved in the business and political scene in Minneapolis, Minnesota community, where he currently resides. Baylor is founder and president of JADT Development Group, a residential and commercial construction firm, in Minneapolis. He also operates three McDonald's franchises in the Minneapolis–St. Paul area.
Baylor has also served as a former member of the Minneapolis Planning Commission from 1992 to 2001, and ran as a candidate for Lieutenant Governor for the State of Minnesota in 2006.

References

1954 births
Living people
American football cornerbacks
American football safeties
Morgan State Bears football players
Baltimore Colts players
Minnesota Vikings players